Eugene Edward Wood  (October 20, 1925 – May 21, 2004) was an American television personality, known primarily for his work as an announcer on various game shows. From the 1950s to the 1990s, he announced many game shows, primarily Mark Goodson–Bill Todman productions such as Family Feud, Classic Concentration, Card Sharks, Password, and Beat the Clock. Wood also served a brief stint as a host on this last show, and on another show, Anything You Can Do. After retiring from game shows in 1996, Wood worked as an announcer for the Game Show Network until his retirement in 1998.

Early life
Wood was born in Quincy, Massachusetts. He majored in speech and theater at Emerson College.

Career
His early career included stand-up comedy, television commercials, and writing for Bob Keeshan of Captain Kangaroo fame. This work included a Terrytoons-produced cartoon series, The Adventures of Lariat Sam, which  aired on the Captain Kangaroo show.  Wood also supplied voices and sang the theme song. Wood also had a comedy career, often pairing with partner Bill Dana, performing their comedy act at nightclubs.

His first role as a game show announcer came as a substitute on the ABC version of Supermarket Sweep in 1966 (though EOTVGS Vol. 2 says his first work as announcer was on the daytime version of Password); three years later, he began a long association with Mark Goodson-Bill Todman Productions, where he worked on Beat the Clock as its announcer from 1969–72; after the departure of the show's host, Jack Narz, Wood then took over as host of Beat the Clock, with Nick Holenreich serving as announcer. Wood hosted the 1971–72 season of the short-lived game show Anything You Can Do, which featured teams of men competing against teams of women in stunts similar to Beat the Clock. He also appeared as a celebrity panelist on one week of Match Game in 1974.

By 1976, Wood had become a regular announcer for Goodson–Todman, working as voice-over for many of the company's game shows. In addition to his role as announcer, Wood regularly served as a warm-up act for the audiences on these shows, and often performed a series of comedy skits.
Among his most popular jobs was as announcer on the original version of Family Feud. The original version, hosted by Richard Dawson, ran on ABC from 1976 to 1985, and when Family Feud was revived in 1988 with Ray Combs as host, Wood announced on that version as well through the 1994–1995 season, during which Dawson returned as host. Another show for which he announced on both the original version and a revival was Card Sharks. The show's first incarnation, starring Jim Perry, ran from 1978–81 on NBC, while two concurrent revivals (one on CBS and another in syndication, hosted by Bob Eubanks and Bill Rafferty, respectively) ran from 1986 to 1989. Wood announced the first few weeks of Bruce Forsyth's Hot Streak on ABC, before being replaced by Marc Summers.

After the 1985 death of the original announcer Johnny Olson on the Bob Barker version of The Price Is Right, Wood was one of four interim announcers on that show, until Rod Roddy was chosen as Olson's successor.  At that same time, Wood also announced on the nightly syndicated version hosted by Tom Kennedy that ran for the season. According to former producer Roger Dobkowitz, between Barker, Goodson & Dobkowitz, himself, felt that his voice was a little on the harsh side and was unsuitable for the show, despite his experience.

Wood returned to Price briefly in 1998 to read the summer rerun fee plugs. He also filled in for Olson, during the final weeks of the Tom Kennedy-hosted version of Body Language. Other shows on which Wood served as a regular announcer were Tattletales (CBS, 1974–78), Double Dare (CBS, 1976–77), Match Game-Hollywood Squares Hour (NBC, 1983–84), Password Plus (NBC, 1979–82), Super Password (NBC, 1984–89), Love Connection (Syndication, 1985–1988), Classic Concentration (NBC, 1987–91), Win, Lose or Draw (Syndicated, 1987–90), the Ross Shafer-hosted Match Game (1990–91) and Family Challenge (1995-96). Prior to his retirement in the late 1990s, he also did voiceovers for the Game Show Network.

Wood wrote the narration for the 1965 film The World of Abbott and Costello.

Death
Wood retired to Adamsville, Rhode Island, in the 1990s. He died of lung cancer in Boston, Massachusetts, on May 21, 2004, aged 78.

References

External links
 
 

1925 births
2004 deaths
American game show hosts
Emerson College alumni
Game show announcers
People from Quincy, Massachusetts
Deaths from lung cancer in Massachusetts